The prix Roger Caillois is an annual literary prize established in 1991 in partnership with the PEN Club in France and the  as well as the Society of readers and friends of Roger Caillois, awarded to both a Latin American and a French author. Since 2007, the prix Roger Caillois for essay comes in addition to these two prizes.

The prize is awarded in December.

Laureates

Latin American authors 

 1991: José Donoso
 1993: Álvaro Mutis 
 1995: Adolfo Bioy Casares 
 1997: Homero Aridjis
 1999: Haroldo de Campos
 2001: Blanca Varela 
 2002: Mario Vargas Llosa 
 2003: Carlos Fuentes 
 2004: Alberto Manguel 
 2006: Sergio Pitol 
 2007: Alan Pauls 
 2008: Ricardo Piglia
 2009: Roberto Bolaño
 2010: Elsa Cross
 2011: Leonardo Padura Fuentes
 2012: Juan Gabriel Vásquez
 2013: Cristina Rivera Garza
 2014: César Aira
 2015: Eduardo Halfon
 2016: Chico Buarque

French-speaking authors 

 1991: Édouard Glissant 
 1992: Jean-Marie Le Sidaner 
 1994: Pierre Gascar 
 1996: Gilles Lapouge 
 1998: Kenneth White 
 1999: Alain Jouffroy
 2000: François Cheng
 2001: Michel Waldberg 
 2002: Gérard Macé 
 2003: Jean Bottéro 
 2004: Michel Braudeau
 2007: Éric Chevillard 
 2008: Roger Grenier
 2009: Pierre Bergounioux
 2010: François Maspero
 2011: Pierre Pachet
 2012: Christian Garcin
 2013: Marcel Cohen
 2014: Chantal Thomas
 2015: Jean-Paul Iommi-Amunategui
 2016: Régis Debray

Essays 
 2007: Maurice Olender
 2008: Serge Gruzinski
 2009: Paul Veyne
 2010: Jacqueline Risset
 2011: Jean-Pierre Dupuy
 2012: Michel Pastoureau
 2013: Régis Boyer
 2014: Jean-Yves Jouannais
 2015: Jean-Paul Demoule
 2016: Alain Corbin

Mention 
 2016: Translator: Jacques Ancet

Special centenary prize 
 2013 : Silvia Baron Supervielle

External links 
 Prix Roger Caillois 2015
 Site of the Maison de l'Amérique latine

French literary awards
Awards established in 1991

1991 establishments in France
Latin American literary awards